Sebastian Heilmann (born 1965 in Offenbach am Main, Germany) is a German political scientist and sinologist. He serves as the founding president of the Mercator Institute for China Studies (MERICS) in Berlin, a think tank established in 2013 by the Mercator Foundation (Stiftung Mercator). Heilmann has published on China's political system, economic policy and international relations. He edited the guide to China's Political System (Lanham, Maryland: Rowman & Littlefield, 2017) and Chinas's Core Executive: Leadership Styles, Structures and Processes under Xi Jinping, 2016. With Elizabeth J. Perry he co-edited the volume Mao’s Invisible Hand: The Political Foundations of Adaptive Governance in China (Harvard University Press, 2011). With Dirk H. Schmidt he co-authored China's Foreign Political and Economic Relations: An Unconventional Global Power (Lanham, Maryland: Rowman & Littlefield, 2014). He is the author of the book Red Swan: How Unorthodox Policy-Making Facilitated China's Rise (Hong Kong, Chinese University Press, January 2018). Heilmann is a professor for the political economy of China at the University of Trier.

Education and academic career 
From 1984 to 1990, Heilmann studied Political Science, Chinese Studies and Comparative Linguistics at the University of Tuebingen, Germany, and at Nanjing University, People's Republic of China (PRC). In 1990, he received a master's degree (M.A.) in Political Science from the University of Tuebingen. Several research fellowships in the United States of America (Stanford University and University of California, Berkeley) and in East Asia (Beijing and Taipei) followed. In 1993, he was awarded his PhD from the Faculty of Law and Economics at the Saar University, Saarbruecken, Germany.

From 1994 to 1999, Heilmann worked as senior researcher for Chinese politics at the German Institute for Asian Affairs in Hamburg (today GIGA German Institute of Global and Area Studies).
In 1999, he completed his second thesis (“habilitation”) on “The Politics of Economic Reform in China and Russia” at the University of Muenster, Germany. He briefly taught at this university as a lecturer. In the same year, he was offered a position as full university professor for comparative government at the department of political science at the University of Trier.

From 2000 to 2006, Heilmann headed the multi-disciplinary “Research Group on Equity Market Regulation (REGEM)” dealing with the political economy of equity markets in a comparative perspective. From 2005 to 2006, he stayed as a visiting fellow at the Fairbank Center of Harvard University. His research there focused on distinctive patterns of the Chinese policy process and China's economic governance in particular. In a multi-year research and publication project about the foundations of “adaptive authoritarianism” in China he collaborated with Elizabeth J. Perry (Harvard University) as a Harvard-Yenching Coordinate Research Scholar in 2007 and 2009. In 2011 and 2012, he was a visiting fellow at the University of Oxford (Merton College and University of Oxford China Centre). As principal investigator from 2010 to 2013, Heilmann headed the project group “China’s industrial and technology policies” within the national research network on “Governance in China” sponsored by the German Federal Ministry of Education and Research. In 2009 and 2012 he was appointed member of the editorial boards of the academic journals Modern China and The China Quarterly. Since 2000, he has been the editor of the study series China Analysis, an academic online publication dealing with contemporary political and economic developments in the Greater China region. Since 2013, he serves as the founding director of the Mercator Institute for China Studies (MERICS) in Berlin,. In 2014, Heilmann was appointed as one of 15 German representatives to the German-Chinese Dialogue Forum.

Selected publications 
 Red Swan: How Unorthodox Policy-Making Facilitated China's Rise. Hong Kong: Chinese University Press, forthcoming January 2018.
 China's Political System (editor). Lanham, Boulder, New York, London: Rowman & Littlefield, 2017. 
 China’s Core Executive: Leadership Styles, Structures and Processes under Xi Jinping, MERICS Papers on China 1, Berlin, 2016. (co-edited with Matthias Stepan)
 China’s Foreign Political and Economic Relations: An Unconventional Global Power (co-authored with Dirk H. Schmidt). Lanham, Maryland: Rowman &Littlefield, 2014.
 “The Reinvention of Development Planning in China, 1993-2012” (co-authored with Oliver Melton), Modern China, November 2013.
 Mao’s Invisible Hand: The Political Foundations of Adaptive Governance in China (co-edited with Elizabeth J. Perry). Cambridge, Mass.: Harvard University Press, 2011.
 “Policy Experimentation in China’s Economic Rise”, Studies in Comparative International Development, March 2008.
 The Political System of the PRC [in German]. Wiesbaden: Springer VS, two editions, 2002 and 2004.
 The Politics of Economic Reform in China and Russia [in German]. Hamburg: German Institute for Asian Affairs, 2000.

References

Living people
German political scientists
German sinologists
University of Tübingen alumni
Nanjing University alumni
Harvard University alumni
Stanford University alumni
Fellows of Merton College, Oxford
1965 births
German male non-fiction writers